You're My Jamaica is the twenty-sixth studio album by American country music artist Charley Pride. It was released in August 1979 via RCA Victor Records and contained ten tracks. It was co-produced by Pride and Jerry Bradley. You're My Jamaica was the twenty sixth studio project released in his music career. Both its singles became major hits on the country charts in the United States and Canada: "Missin' You" and the title track. The record would receive positive reviews from music publications following its release.

Background and content
As Charley Pride's career progressed, he developed a smoother country pop style. This became more evident in the latter half of the 1970s decade with several hits that promoted this image, such as "She's Just an Old Love Turned Memory" and "Where Do I Put Her Memory." You're My Jamaica also exemplified a country pop sound. The album was recorded at the Music City Hall studio, which was located in Nashville, Tennessee. Sessions took place in May 1979 under the co-production of Pride and his recent collaborator, Jerry Bradley. All of the album's ten titles were new tracks. Two of its tracks were cuts composed by Gary McCray: "Heartbreak Mountain" and "Let Me Have a Chance to Love You." It also featured two songs composed by Kent Robbins, including the single "Missin' You."

Release and reception

You're My Jamaica was released in August on RCA Victor Records. The project would make it Pride's twenty sixth studio album release in his recording career. The album was originally distributed as both a vinyl LP and a cassette. The album would peak at number 11 on the Billboard Top Country Albums chart in the fall of 1979. It also reached number six on the Canadian RPM Country Albums chart, becoming his third LP to reach a position on the list. It also was Pride's first studio release to chart in New Zealand, reaching number 33 on their albums chart in 1979. Following its release, You're My Jamaica would receive a positive response from Billboard magazine. Writers of called Pride's vocal performance to be "better than ever" and found the album's material to be top of top quality. The album would later receive three stars from Allmusic.

Two singles would be spawned from You're My Jamaica. The title track was the project's first single release, which occurred in May 1979. It spent 15 weeks on the Billboard Hot Country Songs list and eventually reached the number one spot by September 1979. "Missin' You" was issued in October 1979 as the album's second single. The song also spent 15 weeks on the Billboard country chart and peaked at number two by January 1980. Both singles would reach identical chart positions on the RPM Country Singles chart in Canada.

Track listing

Vinyl and cassette versions

Personnel
All credits are adapted from the liner notes of You're My Jamaica.

Musical personnel
 Harold Bradley – bass guitar
 David Briggs – piano
 Jimmy Capps – guitar
 Ray Edenton – guitar
 Ralph Gallant – drums
 The Jordanaires – background vocals
 Mike Leach – bass
 Charlie McCoy – harmonica, vibes
 Charley Pride – lead vocals
 Pete Wade – guitar
 Chip Young – guitar

Technical personnel
 Jerry Bradley – producer
 Herb Burnette – art direction
 Dan Dea – engineer
 Richard Dodd – engineer
 Bill Harris – engineer
 Randy Kling – mastering
 Mike Moran – arrangement
 Charley Pride – producer
 Nick Sangiamo – photography
 Bergen White – arrangement

Charts

Weekly charts

Year-end charts

Release history

References

1979 albums
Albums produced by Jerry Bradley (music executive)
Albums produced by Charley Pride
Charley Pride albums
RCA Victor albums